The bunny hop or  bunnyhop, is a bicycle trick that allows the rider to launch their bike into the air as if jumping off a ramp. The pedals on the bicycle seem to stick to the rider's feet as the bike becomes airborne, much like how a skateboard seems to stick to the feet of the skater performing an Ollie. While the bunny hop can be quite challenging to learn, once mastered it opens up a whole new level of riding opportunities for both BMX and mountain bike rider alike.

The bunny hop is also a useful skill for an urban cyclist/commuter, allowing the avoidance of potholes and other hazards, and allowing for quick mounting of curbs.

More often, bunny hops are done on BMX bikes, which are smaller than mountain bikes and, because they are lighter, can be lifted more easily.

There are two methods of performing a bunnyhop. The first, sometimes known as an "English" bunnyhop, involves lifting both wheels into the air at once, and is typically easier to do using bicycles with clipless pedals. The second, known as a pro hop or an "American" bunnyhop, involves the rider lifting the front wheel of the bike before the back wheel, and requires precise balance and body movements.

Technique
The bunny hop is executed by approaching an obstacle with a medium rolling speed, arms and legs slightly bent. Upon reaching the obstacle, the rider first needs to shift their center of gravity towards the rear wheel of the bike and pull back on the handlebars, causing the front wheel to lift as if doing a manual. As the front wheel reaches maximum height, they 'scoop' up the rear of the bike by pointing their toes downwards and applying backwards and upwards force to the pedals, while pushing down and forward on the handlebars. It helps to think about the lifting of the back tire as snapping one's wrist forward and shifting their weight at the same time. The combination of these two motions allows the rider to first raise their centre of gravity, and then tuck the bike underneath them, to achieve greater ground clearance.
The second technique, more easily performed on a bicycle with full suspension, is applying a weighting compression force downwards into bars and pedals, once full compression is achieved then springing upwards un-weighting both bars and pedals equal amounts so that both front and rear wheels leave the ground. This technique can also be combined with a lifting of the bike through clip less pedals and is sometimes termed the English bunny hop.

See also
Cycling
Mountain biking
Freestyle BMX
Dirt jumping
Single track (mountain biking)
Glossary of cycling

References

External links

Cycling
Cycle sport
Mountain biking
BMX